Antoniotto II Adorno (c. 1479 – 12 September 1528) was Doge of the Republic of Genoa from 1522 to 1527. Adorno was the last of the Genoese doges elected for life.

Biography 
Member of the patrician Adorno family, considered one of the most influential in the history of the republic, Antoniotto is particularly remembered for having sent the members of the Fregoso family out of Genoa.

An enemy of doge Giano II di Campofregoso, in 1512 he allied with King Louis XII of France in the course of the Italian Wars between France and Spain, and attacked Genoa. The defeat suffered by the French at Novara forced him to take refuge in Milan. Antoniotto tried two further attacks against Genoa in 1513 and 1514, both without success.

When the new doge, Ottaviano di Campofregoso, during the French occupation of Lombardy (September 1515), allied with Francis I of France, Antoniotto switched to the Spanish party. The Spanish victory at the battle of Bicocca (1522) granted him the position of doge. In the same year he had the port of Savona destroyed in retaliation for their rebellion against the Republic of Genoa. He held the title, with little popular support, for five years until, attacked by the French general Odet de Foix and by Andrea Doria, he left Genoa.

He retired to Milan, where he died in 1528.

Popular culture 
He is a character in the opera Die Gezeichneten (first performed 1918) by Austrian composer Franz Schreker.

Sources

1470s births
1528 deaths
16th-century Doges of Genoa